See also Eleanor Bull (maiden name Eleanor Whitney)

Eleanore Whitney (April 12, 1917 – November 1, 1983) was an American film actress and tap dancer. She was born on April 12, 1917, in Cleveland, Ohio. At the age of 10, she began studying dance under Bill Robinson and performed in vaudeville before being cast in a number of motion pictures, many of them musical-comedies.

Whitney was married in 1939 to attorney Frederick Backer. She moved to New York with her husband and did not return to acting.

Filmography
Whitney's filmography, believed to be complete, includes:

 Oh, Evaline! (1935, Short) as Herself
 The Big Broadcast of 1936 (1935) as Herself
 Millions in the Air (1935) as Bubbles
 Screen Snapshots Series 16, No. 1 (1936, documentary short) as Herself
 Timothy's Quest (1936) as Martha
 Three Cheers for Love (1936) as Skippy Dormant
 Hollywood Boulevard (1936) as Herself
 The Big Broadcast of 1937 (1936) as Dance Specialty
 Rose Bowl (1936) as Cheers Reynolds
 College Holiday (1936) as Herself
 Clarence (1937) as Cora Wheeler
 Turn Off the Moon (1937) as Caroline Wilson
 Blonde Trouble (1937) as Edna Baker
 Thrill of a Lifetime (1937) as Betty Jane
 Campus Confessions'' (1938) as Susie Quinn (final film role)

External links 
 
 Eleanore Whitney at Virtual History

References

1917 births
1983 deaths
American film actresses
American female dancers
American tap dancers
Dancers from Ohio
20th-century American actresses
20th-century American dancers